Bradley Arlen Goebel (born October 13, 1967) is a former professional American football player who played quarterback for five seasons for the Philadelphia Eagles, Cleveland Browns and Jacksonville Jaguars.

Goebel appeared in 6 NFL games, starting 2 games in 1991 as the QB for the Philadelphia Eagles and 1 appearance for the Cleveland Browns in 1992. Brad played 3 years for the Browns from 1992–1994. He signed with the Jacksonville Jaguars in 1995.

Goebel played college football for Baylor University from 1986–1990. He was a freshman consensus All-SWC QB in 1987 and held numerous passing records at Baylor. He was inducted into the Baylor Hall of Fame in 2021.

Statistics
Goebel's statistics are as follows:

References

External links
NFL stats

1967 births
Living people
People from Cuero, Texas
Players of American football from Texas
American football quarterbacks
Baylor Bears football players
Jacksonville Jaguars players
Philadelphia Eagles players
San Antonio Riders players
Cleveland Browns players